Piotr Havik (born 7 July 1994) is a Dutch racing cyclist, who currently rides for UCI Continental team .

Major results

2011
 1st Ronde des Vallées
 8th Overall Liège–La Gleize
 10th Omloop Mandel-Leie-Schelde Juniors
2012
 1st  Overall Regio-Tour
 1st  Overall Niedersachsen-Rundfahrt
 1st Omloop Mandel-Leie-Schelde Juniors
 2nd Overall Driedaagse van Axel
 2nd Overall Trophée Center Morbihan
 2nd Bernaudeau Junior
 3rd Kuurne–Brussels–Kuurne Juniors
 8th Overall Oberösterreich-Rundfahrt
 10th Overall Liège–La Gleize
2013
 10th Circuit de Wallonie
2014
 3rd Road race, National Under–23 Road Championships
 4th Ronde van Overijssel
2015
 10th Grand Prix de la ville de Pérenchies
2016
 7th ZODC Zuidenveld Tour
2018
 1st Ronde van Overijssel
 3rd Ronde van Limburg
 4th Overall Tour of Estonia
 7th Antwerp Port Epic
 9th Duo Normand
2019
 1st Grote Prijs Stad Zottegem
 1st Stage 1 (TTT) Kreiz Breizh Elites
 2nd Halle–Ingooigem
 3rd Memorial Rik Van Steenbergen
 4th Antwerp Port Epic
 6th Veenendaal–Veenendaal Classic
 7th Elfstedenronde
 8th Rutland–Melton CiCLE Classic
 10th Volta Limburg Classic
 10th Grote Prijs Jef Scherens
2021 
 6th Antwerp Port Epic

References

External links
 

1994 births
Living people
Dutch male cyclists
Sportspeople from Gouda, South Holland
UCI Road World Championships cyclists for the Netherlands
Cyclists from South Holland
20th-century Dutch people
21st-century Dutch people